Netaji Satabarshiki Mahavidyalaya, established in 2000, is a general degree college in Ashoknagar. It offers undergraduate courses in arts.  It is affiliated to West Bengal State University.

Departments

Arts
Bengali (H+G)
Economics (G)
Education (H+G)
English (H+G)
History (H+G)
Journalism & Mass Communications (H+G)
Music (H+G)
Physical Education (G)
Political Science (H+G)
Sanskrit (H+G)
Sociology (H+G)

Science
Geography (H+G)
Mathematics (G)

Accreditation
Netaji Satabarshiki Mahavidyalaya is recognized by the University Grants Commission (UGC).
Netaji Satabarshiki Mahavidyalaya is accredited by NAAC on July, 2019.

See also
Education in India
List of colleges in West Bengal
Education in West Bengal

References

External links

Universities and colleges in North 24 Parganas district
Colleges affiliated to West Bengal State University
Educational institutions established in 2000
2000 establishments in West Bengal